Swyncombe Downs is a  biological Site of Special Scientific Interest east of Wallingford in Oxfordshire. Part of it is an Iron Age hillfort, Wyfold Castle, which is a Scheduled Monument.

This is an area of chalk grassland and scrub on the steep slopes of the Chiltern Hills. The site is described by Natural England as  outstanding for its butterflies and moths. Butterflies include the silver-spotted skipper, which is nationally rare, grizzled skipper and  dark green fritillary. There are day flying moths such as the cistus forester, chimney sweeper and  wood tiger.

References

 
Sites of Special Scientific Interest in Oxfordshire